The Ecuadoran 2010 Public Service Organic Law ( Ley orgánica del servicio público) was on 30 September 2010 a draft law that intended to regulate the Ecuadoran public service, by creating a standardised base for the payment of compensation to civil servants. The draft has gone through several constitutional steps to becoming a law. As of 2 October 2010, it had not yet become a law. The law was one of the elements in the 2010 Ecuador coup d'état attempt.

Important and/or controversial elements of the law

Some police officers felt that the law negatively affected their labor rights.

Legal progress of the law project
President Rafael Correa proposed the law on 2 July 2010. The law passed through first and second parliamentary readings and a plenary approval. President Correa's response on 3 September was that he made a partial objection to the law proposal. As of 2 October 2010, the law had not yet reached a final status.

Relation to the attempted coup d'état

The law was claimed by participants in the 2010 coup d'état attempt against Correa to be the reason for the attempted coup d'état.

References

Law of Ecuador